"Afternoon Delight" is a hit song recorded by Starland Vocal Band, known for its close harmony and sexually suggestive wordplay. It was written by band member Bill Danoff.

"Afternoon Delight" charted well in New Zealand, peaking at #5. In Australia it was a #6 hit (Adelaide radio station 5KA was first to pick up the single, making it #1 in South Australia). In the UK, it reached #18 and was used as theme to a weekly show of the same title on London's Capital Radio, hosted by Duncan Johnson, and from 1980 on an afternoon show using the same title, broadcast every weekday at Mercia Sound in Coventry, presented by Stuart Linnell. It became a US #1 single on July 10, 1976 and earned a gold record. "Afternoon Delight" also reached #1 in Canada.

Background and writing
The title came from the happy hour menu at Clyde's restaurant in Georgetown, Washington, D.C., where Bill Danoff was eating with fellow bandmember Margot Chapman, while his then-wife Taffy Danoff was undergoing surgery for cervical cancer. Danoff enjoyed writing the song and downplayed the somewhat controversial lyrics: "I didn't want to write an all-out sex song ... I just wanted to write something that was fun and hinted at sex."

Cover versions
Concurrent with the Starland Vocal Band version, country singer Johnny Carver's cover went Top 10 on Billboard Hot Country Singles.

In 1983, the Circle Jerks also covered it as one of the six covers on "Golden Shower of Hits (Jerks on 45)", which appears on their album Golden Shower of Hits.

In the 2004 film, Anchorman: The Legend of Ron Burgundy, the song is sung by the news crew in choir and referenced multiple times and came with a music video in the bonus disc.

British experimental folk music band Current 93 used an industrial-style cover as an introduction to performances of their 2009 album.

Claude François sang it in French as "Dimanche après-midi". In season two of the television series Arrested Development, the episode "Afternoon Delight" sees several characters singing the song at various points, often without knowledge of the song's subject matter.

The popular TV series Glee also covered it in their episode "Sexy", with Dianna Agron, Jayma Mays, Mark Salling, Lea Michele, and John Stamos singing.

It was also used in the film Politically Correct University (PCU) in which frat brothers from a rival fraternity set the stereo to play it over and over again on high volume and locking the doors thereby forcing the rival fraternity to have to listen to it over and over again.

It was briefly used as the intro song for the Australian 1980s Children's TV show Simon Townsend's wonderworld. It was replaced once the creator/producer of the show discovered that the song was about an afternoon sexual encounter.

Critical reaction
At the 19th Grammy Awards ceremony in 1977, "Afternoon Delight" received three nominations for recordings from 1976. It won the Grammy Award for Best Arrangement for Voices and was also nominated for Best Pop Performance by a Duo or Group with Vocals and Song of the Year.

In 2010, Billboard named "Afternoon Delight" the 20th sexiest song of all time.

Chart performance

Weekly charts

Year-end charts

All-time charts

Johnny Carver version

See also
List of 1970s one-hit wonders in the United States
https://wtop.com/dc/2023/02/how-a-georgetown-restaurants-specials-menu-led-to-1970s-afternoon-delight-earworm/

References

External links
 
 

1976 debut singles
Billboard Hot 100 number-one singles
Cashbox number-one singles
RPM Top Singles number-one singles
Johnny Carver songs
Starland Vocal Band songs
Songs written by Bill Danoff
Grammy Award for Best Vocal Arrangement for Two or More Voices
1976 songs
RCA Records singles
Song recordings produced by Milt Okun
Country pop songs